Elasmotherium is an extinct genus of large rhinoceros endemic to Eurasia during Late Miocene through the Pleistocene, existing at least as recently as 39,000 years ago in the Late Pleistocene. A more recent date of 26,000 BP is considered less reliable. It was the last surviving member of Elasmotheriinae, a distinctive group of rhinoceroses separate from the group that contains living rhinoceros (Rhinocerotinae). The two groups are estimated to have split at least 35 million years ago according to fossils and molecular evidence.

Five species are recognised. The genus first appeared in the Late Miocene in China, likely having evolved from Sinotherium, before spreading to the Pontic–Caspian steppe, the Caucasus and Central Asia. The best known, E. sibiricum, sometimes called the Siberian unicorn, was the size of a mammoth and is thought to have borne a large, thick horn on its forehead (though see below). Like all rhinoceroses, elasmotheres were herbivorous. Unlike any other rhinos and any other ungulates aside from some notoungulates, its high-crowned molars were ever-growing, and it was likely adapted for a grazing diet. Its legs were longer than those of other rhinos and were adapted for galloping, giving it a horse-like gait.

Taxonomy
 
Elasmotherium was first described in 1809 by German/Russian palaeontologist Gotthelf Fischer von Waldheim based on a left lower jaw, four molars, and the tooth root of the third premolar, which was gifted to Moscow University by princess Ekaterina Dashkova in 1807. He first announced it at an 1808 presentation before the Moscow Society of Naturalists. The genus name derives from Ancient Greek elasmos "laminated" and therion "beast" in reference to the laminated folding of the tooth enamel; and the species name sibericus is probably a reference to the predominantly Siberian origin of princess Dashkova's collection. However, the specimen's exact origins are unknown. In 1877, German naturalist Johann Friedrich von Brandt placed it into the newly erected subfamily Elasmotheriinae, separate from modern rhinos. In 1997, the McKenna/Bell classification considered Elasmotherium to be closely related to the wooly and modern rhinos, and placed it into the subfamily Rhinocerotinae. A complete mitochondrial genome obtained from a specimen of E. sibiricum vindicated von Brandt, finding it to be the sister taxon to all living rhinoceroses, with an estimated divergence time of 47.4 million years ago, with a 95% highest posterior density of 41.9–53.2 Ma.

The genus is known from hundreds of find sites, mainly of cranial fragments and teeth, but in some cases nearly complete skeletons of post-cranial bones, scattered over Eurasia from Eastern Europe to China. Dozens of crania have been reconstructed and given archaeological identifiers. The division into species is based mainly on the fine distinctions of the teeth and jaws and the shape of the skull.

Evolution
Rhinoceroses are divided into two subfamilies, Rhinocerotinae and Elasmotheriinae, which diverged perhaps 47.3 mya, 35 mya at the latest. Elasmotherium is the only known member of the latter from after the Miocene, others becoming extinct with the expansion of savannas. The oldest known species of Elasmotherium is Elasmotherium primigenium from the Late Miocene of Dingbian County in Shaanxi, China. Elasmotherium likely evolved from Sinotherium, a genus of elasmothere also found in China. Elasmotherium arrived in Eastern Europe around 2.5 million years ago, during the earliest part of the Pleistocene epoch.

Hypsodonty, a dentition pattern where the molars have high crowns and the enamel extends below the gum line, is thought to be a characteristic of Elasmotheriinae, perhaps as an adaptation to the heavier grains featured in riparian zones on riversides.

Species
There are four chronospecies of Elasmotherium aside from the aforementioned E. primigenium, which are - from oldest to youngest - E. chaprovicum, E. peii, E. caucasicum and E. sibiricum, and which together span from the Late Pliocene to the Late Pleistocene.

An elasmotherian species turned up in the preceding Khaprovian or Khaprov Faunal Complex, which was at first taken to be E. caucasicum, and then on the basis of the dentition was redefined as a new species, E. chaprovicum (Shvyreva, 2004), named after the Khaprov Faunal Complex. The Khaprov is in the Middle Villafranchian, MN17, which spans the Piacenzian of the Late Pliocene and the Gelasian of the Early Pleistocene of Northern Caucasus, Moldova and Asia and has been dated to 2.6–2.2 Ma.

E. peii was first described by (Chow, 1958) for remains found in Shaanxi, China. Additional remains from Shaanxi were described in 2018 The species is also known from numerous remains from the classical range of Elasmotherium, some sources have considered this species to be a synonym of E. caucasicum, but it is currently considered distinct. it is found during the Psekups faunal complex between 2.2 and 1.6 Ma.

E. caucasicum was first described by Russian palaeontologist Aleksei Borissiak in 1914, who said it apparently flourished in the Black Sea region as a member of the Early Pleistocene Tamanian Faunal Unit (1.1–0.8 Ma, Taman Peninsula). It is the most commonly found mammal of the assemblage. E. caucasicum is thought to be more primitive than E. sibiricum and perhaps represents an ancestral stock. It is also known in northern China from the Early Pleistocene Nihewan Faunal assemblage and were extinct at approximately 1.6 Ma. This suggests Elasmotherium developed separately in Russia and China.

E. sibiricum, described by Johann Fischer von Waldheim in 1808 and chronologically the latest species of the sequence appeared in the Middle Pleistocene, ranging from southwestern Russia to western Siberia and southward into Ukraine and Moldova.

Description
Elasmotherium is typically reconstructed as a woolly animal, generally based on the woolliness exemplified in contemporary megafauna such as mammoths and the woolly rhino. However, it is sometimes depicted as bare-skinned like modern rhinos. In 1948, Russian palaeontologist Valentin Teryaev suggested it was semi-aquatic with a dome-like horn, and resembled a hippo because the animal had 4 toes like a wetland tapir rather than the 3 toes in other rhinos, but Elasmotherium has since been shown to have had only 3 functional toes, and Teryaev's reconstruction has not garnered much scientific attention.

Both species were among the largest rhinos, comparable in size to the woolly mammoth and larger than the contemporary woolly rhinoceros. The feet were unguligrade, the front larger than the rear, with 3 digits at the front and rear, with a vestigial fifth metacarpal.

Dentition

 
Like other rhinos, Elasmotherium had two premolars and three molars for chewing, and lacked incisors and canines, relying instead on a prehensile lip to strip food. Elasmotherium were euhypsodonts, with large tooth crowns and enamel extending below the gum line, and continuously growing teeth.

Elasmotherium fossils rarely show evidence of tooth roots.

Horn 
The furrows are interpreted as the seats of blood vessels for horn-generating tissue.

 
In rhinos, the horn is not attached to bone, but grows from the surface of a dense skin tissue, anchoring itself by creating bone irregularities and rugosities. The outermost layer cornifies. As the layers age, the horn loses diameter by degradation of the keratin due to ultraviolet light, drying out, and continual wearing. However, melanin and calcium deposits in the centre harden the keratin there, which gives the horn its distinctive shape.

There was likely a large hump of muscle on the back, which is generally thought to have supported a heavy horn.

A 2021 study challenges assumptions of Elasmotherium having had a horn by comparing its cranial dome and neck musculature to those of modern rhinos. The study finds that both are ill-suited for a large horn and more likely are indicative of a smaller horn, and that the dome could function as a resonating chamber of some sort, akin to that of Rusingoryx and hadrosaur crests.

Palaeobiology

Diet

Modern hypsodont hoofed mammals are generally grazers of open environments, with hypsodonty possibly an adaptation to chewing tough, fibrous grass. Elasmotherium dental wearing is similar to that of the grazing white rhino, and both of their heads have a downward orientation, indicating a similar lifestyle and an ability to only reach low-lying plants. In fact, the head of Elasmotherium had the most obtuse angle of any rhinoceros, and could only reach the lowest levels and therefore must have grazed habitually. Elasmotherium also displays euhypsodonty, which is typically seen in rodents, and dental physiology could have been influenced by pulling up food from moist, grainy soil. Therefore, they may have inhabited both mammoth steppeland and riparian riversides, similar to contemporary mammoths.

Movement
However, Elasmotherium had double the weight–about –and consequently had a more restricted gait and mobility, likely achieving much slower speeds.

Extinction
Elasmotherium was previously thought to have gone extinct around 200,000 years ago as part of normal extinction, but E. sibiricum skull fragments from the Pavlodar Region, Kazakhstan, shows its persistence in the Western Siberian Plain about 36,000–35,000 years ago. Isolated remains dating to 50,000 years ago are known from the Siberian Smelovskaya and Batpak Caves, likely dragged there by a predator.

This timing is roughly coincident with the Pleistocene extinction, during which many mammal species with body weights >45 kg died out. This coincided with a shift to a cooler climate–which resulted in replacement of grasses and herbs by lichens and mosses–and the migration of modern humans into the area.

See also

 Aegyrcitherium
 Bugtirhinus
 Hispanotherium
 Sinotherium
 Coelodonta

Notes

References

External links

 
 

Pleistocene mammals of Asia
Piacenzian first appearances
Pleistocene genus extinctions
Pliocene rhinoceroses
Unicorns
Pleistocene rhinoceroses
Fossil taxa described in 1808
Taxa named by Gotthelf Fischer von Waldheim